Come Back to Sorrento is a novel written by Dawn Powell. Against Powell’s wishes, the publisher changed its title to The Tenth Moon when it was first published in 1932.

Publication history
1932: The Tenth Moon. New York, NY: Farrar & Rinehart.
1997: Come Back to Sorrento. Royalton, Vermont: Steerforth Press.
2000: Come Back to Sorrento. London, UK: Turnaround.
2001: Dawn Powell: Novels 1930–1942. New York: The Library of America. .

References

1932 American novels
American novels adapted into films